The Piper Downs are a four-piece alternative rock band from Los Angeles, California.

Band history
The band met while students at Virginia Commonwealth University, and then moved to Los Angeles. Bobby Bognar was the frontman for the Richmond, Virginia band Hanover Fiske. Upon the breakup of Hanover Fiske, Bognar decided to move to Los Angeles to pursue a solo music career. In 1994, Bognar returned home for the holidays and spent time with Knutson and Yell, who were the guitarists of Richmond band The Distractions. Excited by the musical chemistry, the two Distractions moved to Los Angeles with Bognar to form Bobby Bognar and the Distractions. After releasing 1995's First Time and 1997's Heed, the band changed their name to The Piper Downs (a reference from the movie So I Married an Axe Murderer).

Music career
In 1999, the band released the Rock Juice EP, which showcased, among other things, the magnificent and swirling bass solos for which Yell has become known.

2002, saw the release of their most recent album, Varying Degrees of Failure and Tunelessness, which introduced their most popular song to date, "Louder", and three music videos.

The band has a guitar as part of the Hard Rock Cafe permanent memorabilia collection, have twice been named the "Best Unsigned Band in Los Angeles," appeared on radio, movies, and television shows, headlined the local stage at the Vans Warped Tour, and opened for Sammy Hagar in Cabo San Lucas, Mexico. The Downs were named the "Best New Band in America" by the Global Battle of the Bands GBOB, and came in fourth in the world competition held in London, England.

The Piper Downs have toured all across the US, in England, Mexico, and Australia.

Their single "Louder" is featured on the Zoey 101 soundtrack, Zoey 101: Music Mix, released by Sony Records.

References

External links

Rock music groups from California
Musical groups from Los Angeles